is an adventure game co-developed by Hyde and Medix, and published by Medix exclusively in Japan. The game's characters were designed by famous character designer and animator Atsuko Nakajima.

Summary 
The game's plot involves the titular Cyber Attack Team defending cyberspace inside a computer network from evil viruses and monsters. The game consists of ten chapters, with each one divided into "adventure" and "simulation" sections.

References 

2003 video games
Adventure games
Japan-exclusive video games
Video games developed in Japan
Xbox games
Xbox-only games